Queen Fumi (born Fumilayo Raim) is a Beninise musician who debuted with her first single Romantic Boy in 2016 and releasing songs such as "Zero" and "Madame" in the first and latter parts of 2018, and "Coco" in the first part of 2019 respectively. Her latest collaboration with Gabonese musician Tina, titled "Affaire de Boy" has “further catapulted her into additional notoriety and gained her more audience in other parts of Africa and beyond”.

Early life 
Fumilayo started her career nearing her college years but first discovered her interest in music at an early age, at about the age of 8. From 12 years onwards, she began to engage in cultural performances organized by colleagues of hers. She began a formal music career in 2015 and released her first acclaimed song in March of 2016.

Career 
Queen Fumi developed a musical style which combines urban with traditional sounds from where she hails. She started her musical journey showcasing her musical talent on various social media platforms before continuing her musical journey with joining the Blue Diamond production label from Benin Republic in 2017 where she quickly moved through their ranks along with other Benin prodigies such as Fanicko, Manzor and Zeynab. She has gradually gained a high level of fame in the Benin Republic. Two years later, she moved on to release the hit song "Affaire de Boy" along with popular Gabonese musician Tina which brought her even greater career success yet unseen. In 2020, there were rumors of Fumi leaving her production label Blue Diamond, suggesting she was preparing herself as a more independent Beninise artist.

Awards and nominations

Discography 
Some of Queen Fumi's most entertained songs are

 Zero, 2018
 Madame, 2018
 Coco, 2019
 Affaire de Boy, 2019

References 

Afrobeat musicians
1992 births
Living people